Saint Charles Borromeo Seminary may refer to:
 St. Charles Borromeo Seminary in Philadelphia
 Saint Charles Borromeo Seminary of the Catholic Diocese of El Paso, Texas 
 Saint Charles Borromeo Major Seminary of Nyakibanda in Rwanda
 San Carlos Seminary of the Archdiocese of Manila in Makati, Philippines
 San Carlos Major Seminary of the Archdiocese of Cebu 
 Priestly Seminary of St. Charles Borromeo (Kňazský Seminár sv. Karola Boromejského) in Košice, Slovakia,
 Colegio San Carlos in Bogotá, Colombia,